Glenn L. Kirschner (born January 2, 1961) is an American attorney, a former U.S. Army prosecutor, and an NBC News/MSNBC legal analyst.

Early life
Glenn Louis Kirschner was born in Brooklyn, New York City in 1961, and raised in New Jersey. He graduated from New Jersey's Point Pleasant Borough High School in 1979, where he wrestled and played football, and earned a U.S. Army Student Achievement Award. He attended Washington and Lee University, where he studied journalism. While at Washington and Lee, he was awarded an Army ROTC scholarship and joined the Virginia Beta chapter of the Phi Kappa Psi fraternity. He played for the Washington and Lee Generals football team as a center on the offensive line for four seasons and was elected by his teammates as one of three team captains for his senior year. Kirschner earned Old Dominion Athletic Conference all-conference honors his sophomore, junior and senior years and was named a first-team Kodak All-American college football player his senior year. He was inducted into Washington and Lee University's Athletic Hall of Fame in 2009.

Upon graduating from college in 1984, Kirschner obtained an educational deferment of his military service to attend law school. While attending New England Law Boston he earned two American Jurisprudence awards (in trial practice and wills, estates and trusts) and was designated a Board of Trustees Scholar after his second year. He received his J.D. degree cum laude in 1987 and entered active duty with the U.S. Army Judge Advocate General's Corps in January 1988.

Career
Upon entering active duty as an Army JAG, Kirschner served his first tour at Fort Richardson (Alaska), serving as an Army prosecutor. In that capacity he investigated and prosecuted court-martial cases and served as legal advisor to the post's many commanding officers. After three years in that assignment, Kirschner was transferred to the U.S. Army's Legal Services Agency in Falls Church, Virginia, where he served as a government appellate attorney handling criminal appeals of court-martial convictions. In that assignment, Kirschner handled espionage and death penalty cases among others.

After more than six years of active duty service, Kirschner was honorably discharged from the Army at the rank of captain. In June 1994, he joined the United States Attorney for the District of Columbia office as an assistant U.S. Attorney.

After a few early rotational assignments, Kirschner joined the US Attorney Office (USAO) Homicide Section led at the time by Robert Mueller. Kirschner spent 24 years at the DC USAO, prosecuting lengthy RICO trials in DC Federal Court and murder/conspiracy/obstruction of justice cases in DC Superior Court. Kirschner prosecuted more than 50 murder trials, served as Deputy Chief of the Homicide Section for four years, and was Chief of the Homicide Section from 2004 to 2010. He retired from the US Attorney's office on June 1, 2018.

Kirschner received the Harold J. Sullivan Award for Fairness, Ethics and Trial Excellence in 2017 and the John F. Evans Award for Trial Excellence in 2001, both from the Assistant U.S. Attorney's Association; the John F. Evans Award for Trial Excellence, the Chief of Police Medal of Honor in 2009 and 2010 from the Washington DC Metropolitan Police Department, and was inducted as a fellow into the American College of Trial Lawyers in 2018. Notable cases include:

U.S. v. London Ford - A landmark gang case involving the District of Columbia's first urban warfare theory of homicide liability.

U.S. v. Andre Burno - Motivated by a desire to steal a police officer's Glock firearm, the defendant ambushed an on-duty police officer, shooting him in the neck. The case/defendant is the subject of an Emmy-Award-winning HBO documentary Thug Life in DC.

U.S v. Jose Rodriguez-Cruz - In 2009, EPA employee Pam Butler disappeared. In 2016, the cold case was revived, and enough evidence was developed to charge Ms. Butler's boyfriend with her murder. Although Ms. Butler's body was never found, the defendant pleaded guilty in 2017. The case is the subject of a Dateline NBC documentary that aired in November 2018.

U.S. v. Albrecht Muth - A controversial case involving a highly skilled conman in elite DC political circles who murdered his elderly, socialite wife. Kirschner tried the defendant in absentia from his hospital bed after he had starved himself into physical incapacitation. The case is the subject of a major motion picture directed by and starring Christoph Waltz titled, "Georgetown" and released in April 2019.

Film portrayal
In the 2019 film Georgetown, directed by Christoph Waltz, Kirschner is portrayed by Paulino Nunes in his role as the prosecutor in the Albrecht Muth case. Described by the website ComingSoon.net, Georgetown "is inspired by the true story of Albrecht Muth, who was convicted in 2011 for murdering his much older socialite wife in Washington, D.C. Based on one of the city's most sensational scandals of recent times, the film will tell the story of an unconventional love affair, an outsider striving for acceptance and the desperate struggle for significance on every level."

Media commentary
For developments with the Special Counsel Bob Mueller investigation, Kirschner provided legal commentary on national news media programs such as MSNBC' s Morning Joe, MSNBC Live and Hardball with Chris Matthews, CNN's The Lead with Jake Tapper and The Stephanie Miller Show.

In mid-September 2020, Kirschner argued that grand juries should be convened and President Donald Trump charged with manslaughter or murder for deaths due to his mishandling of the COVID pandemic.

Kirschner produces a daily legal news analysis video on his Justice Matters YouTube channel. In November 2022, Kirschner teamed up with YouTuber Bryan Tyler Cohen to produce occasional  Legal Breakdown videos, in which Cohen interviews Kirschner on topics like the former president and allies' legal exposure in various civil suits and criminal cases.

References

External links
 
 Glenn Kirschner YouTube channel
 Justice Matters podcast on Stitcher

American jurists
American prosecutors
MSNBC people
Washington and Lee University alumni
New England Law Boston alumni
People from Point Pleasant, New Jersey
Point Pleasant Borough High School alumni
Living people
1961 births